Alidad may refer to:

 Alidade, a measuring device
 Alidad, Khuzestan, a village in Iran
 Alidad, Lorestan, a village in Iran